Ionov is a rural locality (a khutor) in Sestrenskoye Rural Settlement, Kamyshinsky District, Volgograd Oblast, Russia. The population was 34 as of 2010. There are 3 streets.

Geography 
Ionov is located in steppe, on the Volga Upland, on the Kamyshinka River, 18 km southwest of Kamyshin (the district's administrative centre) by road. Vikhlyantsevo is the nearest rural locality.

References 

Rural localities in Kamyshinsky District